"Aşkı Bulamam Ben" (English: I Cannot Find Love) is the first single of Turkish singer Murat Boz. After the success of "Aşkı Bulamam Ben" Murat Boz released his first album Maximum which featured this single. The single consists of 2 songs and 2 versions. The video of the song, Aşkı Bulamam Ben helped him to win the Kral TV's 2006's Best New Male Artist Prize.

Track list

Chart

References

External links
Murat Boz Aşkı Bulamam Ben Single Site

2006 singles
Murat Boz songs
2006 songs